Jahoda (Czech and Slovak, feminine: Jahodová) or Yahoda is a surname. It is a cognate of Jagoda and Yagoda. Notable people with the surname include:

 Gloria Jahoda (1926–1980), American author
 Gustav Jahoda (1920–2016), Austrian psychologist
 Libuše Jahodová (born 1992), Czech sport shooter
 Marie Jahoda (1907–2001), Austrian-British psychologist
 Myroslav Yahoda (1957–2018), Ukrainian artist and writer
 Roman Jahoda (born 1976), Czech-born Austrian judoka
 Sára Jahodová (born 1984), Czech curler

See also
 

Czech-language surnames
Slovak-language surnames